L'Aube was a daily newspaper founded by Francisque Gay that was published in France between 1932 and 1951.

It presented a Christian Democratic viewpoint.

The newspaper struggled in the period before World War II (1939–45), and was closed from 1940 to 1944.

After the liberation of France it was relaunched, and at first had considerable success as the organ of the Popular Republican Movement.
With changes in the political mood in the post-war period it went into decline and was forced to close in 1951.

Origins

Francisque Gay, future publisher and editor of L'Aube, launched the weekly La Vie Catholique in October 1924.

The journal aimed to inform and unite Catholics of different viewpoints. La Vie Catholique was independent, and after 1926 was hostile to the right-wing Action Française movement, although in 1928 Gay asserted that it was not involved in party politics.

In January 1932 Gay launched the new Catholic daily L'Aube.
He intended the paper to be read by all "democrats with a Christian inspiration."

History

The first issue of L'Aube appeared on 20 January 1932.

The paper was founded without capital, and never had enough subscribers.

It was also handicapped by a legacy of mistrust and resentment from the controversies of La Vie Catholique. 

The newspaper had between 7,000 and 11,000 subscribers at first.
Gay launched the "Amis de l'Aube" in 1937 in an effort the gain support.
The association met in Paris for three days in November 1937, and had 1,342 members.

By 1938 and 1939 the paper printed at least 20,000 copies, but still sold only 12,000 to 15,000 copies.

The future premier Georges Bidault began contributing to the paper in March 1932.
Bidault began writing editorials in 1934, and in effect became editor-in-chief.

From 1934 the journal was the joint work of Gay and Bidault.
L'Aube became noted for Bidault's editorials.

The paper continued the fight against the Action Française.

It had a complex relationship with the Popular Democratic Party (PDP), which it increasingly saw as belonging to the right.

On colonial issues the paper rejected the "mystique of Empire" and opposed repressive measures.

In 1939 the paper opposed the policy of appeasement of Hitler.

Maurice Schumann was the political editor of L'Aube at the start of World War II (1939–45), writing under the pseudonym of André Sidobre.
During the war the paper ceased publication on 10 June 1940, and resumed on 23 August 1944.

When it  was relaunched after the Liberation of France it printed 240,000 copies.

In the first two years the paper prospered, due in part to the popularity of the Popular Republican Movement, in part to the fact that its rival Catholic daily, La Croix, did not appear for six months after the liberation of Paris.

After that, L'Aube went into steady decline.
Schumann was political director of the newspaper from 1945 to 1951.

Post-war daily print volumes were:

1944 180,000
1945 180,000
1946 240,000
1947 108,000
1948 60,000
1949 40,000
1950 36,000
1951 35,000

The paper did not appear between 13 February 1947 and 17 March 1947.
The last issue appeared on 20 October 1951.

Notes

Sources

 

1932 establishments in France
1951 disestablishments in France
Defunct newspapers published in France
Newspapers published in Paris
Publications established in 1932
Publications disestablished in 1951
Daily newspapers published in France